Kageura (written: 影浦 or 景浦) is a Japanese surname. Notable people with the surname include:

, Japanese judoka
, Japanese baseball player

Japanese-language surnames